The Korea Transportation Safety Authority (KOTSA,  - 交通安全公團) is a transportation safety authority of the government of South Korea. It is headquartered in Gimcheon-si, Gyeongsangbuk-do.

See also

 The Korea Transport Institute
 Aviation and Railway Accident Investigation Board, fusion of Korea Aviation Accident Investigation Board and Railway Accident Investigation Board.
 Korean Maritime Safety Tribunal

References

External links
 Korea Transportation Safety Authority
 Korea Transportation Safety Authority 

Government agencies of South Korea
Transport in South Korea
Ansan
Transport safety organizations